Planisware is a software company that is the developer and provider of Planisware Enterprise and Planisware Orchestratwo Enterprise Project Portfolio Management (PPM) applicationswhich are delivered globally via its Business Innovation Cloud.  Planisware targets multiple industries, including energy, medical devices, high-tech, aerospace & defense, chemicals, government, pharmaceutical, and automotive.

Since 1997, Planisware has experienced annual, profitable growth, and in 2021 the company reached $130 million in revenue.

Product

Functional scope 
Planisware Enterprise is Planisware's primary software for Strategic Portfolio Management, Project Portfolio Management, and Innovation Management/NPD (New Product Development). Planisware Orchestra is Planisware's primary software for Adaptive Project Management, and Collaborative PPM.

Product architecture 
Planisware Enterprise provides Software-as-a-Service (SaaS) via a three-tier architecture: a browser on the client side, an application server and a database. On the client side, Planisware supports any mainstream browser on Microsoft Windows, Linux/UNIX, Mac platforms and runs with an Ajax applet. The Planisware application server combines with a classic Web server (IIS and Apache). The database can be either Oracle or SQL Server or PostgreSQL.  

Planisware Orchestra provides Software-as-a-Service (SaaS) via a three-tier architecture: a browser on the client side, an application server and a database. On the client side, Planisware Orchestra supports the following browser: Microsoft Edge, Firefox and Google Chrome. The Planisware application server combines with a classic Web server (IIS and Apache). The database is based on PostgreSQL.

Markets and product reviews 
Planisware's customer base encompasses various industries, including energy, medical device, high-tech, aerospace & defense, chemicals, government, pharmaceutical and automotive. Planisware targets more specifically:
 New Product Development 
 IT Project & Portfolio Management
 Life Sciences
 Engineering & Construction
 Earned Value Management

According to several analysts, Planisware strength lies in its highly configurable environment and functional scope breadth.

Reports from analyst firms 
The Info-Tech Research Group ranked Planisware as a "Champion" in their Enterprise Project Portfolio Management Report for 2021. It has been featured in Gartner's Project Portfolio Management Magic Quadrant as a Leader, and in its Strategic Portfolio Management and Enterprise Agile Planning Magic Quadrants as a Challenger. The company was named a Leader in Forrester's Strategic Portfolio Management Wave in 2022.

See also 
List of project management software
Project portfolio management

References 

Project management software
Business software
Business software for Windows